Temnolopha is a genus of moths belonging to the subfamily Olethreutinae of the family Tortricidae.

Species
Temnolopha abstrusana Kuznetzov, 1988
Temnolopha bigutatta Diakonoff, 1973
Temnolopha matura Diakonoff, 1973
Temnolopha mosaica Lower, 1901
Temnolopha sponditis (Meyrick, 1918)

See also
List of Tortricidae genera

References

External links
tortricidae.com

Olethreutini
Tortricidae genera